Amit Kuila (born 9 July 1995) is an Indian cricketer. He plays Twenty20 cricket for Bengal. He made his first-class debut for Bengal in the 2016–17 Ranji Trophy on 20 October 2016, taking five wickets in the first innings. He made his List A debut on 25 September 2019, for Railways in the 2019–20 Vijay Hazare Trophy.

See also
 List of Bengal cricketers

References

External links
 

1995 births
Living people
Indian cricketers
Bengal cricketers
Railways cricketers
People from Midnapore